"Rare, Precious and Gone" is a song by Scottish singer-songwriter Mike Scott, released as the second single from his second solo album Still Burning. It was written by Mike Scott, and produced by Scott and Niko Bolas. "Rare, Precious and Gone" reached No. 74 on the UK Singles Chart in February 1998.

Scott wrote "Rare, Precious and Gone" in 1986 at Lotts Lane in Dublin, but it was not recorded until sessions for Still Burning. A live version of the song, recorded for Virgin Radio in September 1997, was included on the 1998 compilation The Whole of the Moon: The Music of Mike Scott and the Waterboys.

Music video
A music video was filmed in a video booth at Heathrow Airport, while Scott and his band were waiting to board a flight to Japan. Scott had initially intended to have his photo taken "for a laugh" when he discovered the booth actually recorded videos, which gave him the idea of recording a £5 music video for his upcoming single. He had the track play on his cassette player as he mimed to the track, then packaged and sent the result to Chrysalis. In his autobiography, Scott recalled: "Within a week it had been shown on several TV shows, exceeding the combined broadcast tally of the last three £50,000 videos I'd done for Chrysalis and Geffen. But even this exposure, and the dubious distinction of having made a video for a fiver, couldn't propel a Mike Scott song into the charts in 1997."

Critical reception
In a review of Still Burning, Caroline Sullivan of The Guardian noted: "There's a new soulishness bestowed by Chicago guitarist Chris Bruce. Go directly to 'Rare, Precious and Gone' for coffee-table funk, then get over the shock on the acoustic 'Open'." The Scottish Music Network wrote: "Tracks such as 'Rare, Precious and Gone' rekindle the brass driven power of yesteryear, but most of all the dynamic electric guitars are a delight." James F. Laverty of The Phantom Tollbooth commented: "Scott may have left the 'Big Music' behind with the Eighties, but he still enjoys strings and trumpets when they're called for on songs like 'Love Anyway' and 'Rare, Precious and Gone'."

Formats

Personnel
Rare, Precious and Gone
 Mike Scott - lead vocals, rhythm guitar
 Ian McNabb - backing vocals
 Chris Bruce - lead guitar
 James Hallawell - organ
 The Kick Horns, The Memphis Horns - horns
 Pino Palladino - bass
 Jim Keltner - drums
 Preston Heyman - percussion

Production
 Mike Scott - producer (all tracks)
 Niko Bolas - producer, recording and engineer on "Rare, Precious and Gone"
 Chris Blair - mastering on "Rare, Precious and Gone"
 Chris Sheldon - mixing on "Rare, Precious and Gone"

Other
 Bruce Fisher at Sold Out - design
 Mary Scanlon - photography

Charts

References

1997 songs
1998 singles
Chrysalis Records singles
Songs written by Mike Scott (musician)
Song recordings produced by Mike Scott (musician)
Song recordings produced by Niko Bolas